Erastus Root (March 16, 1773 – December 24, 1846) was an American lawyer and politician from New York. He is most notable for serving four separate non-consecutive terms in the  U.S. House of Representatives in the early 19th Century.

Early life
Root was born on March 16, 1773, in Hebron in the Connecticut Colony. He was a son of William Root (1731–1790) and Zeruiah (née Baldwin) Root (1729–1792).

He graduated from Dartmouth College in 1793 and became a teacher. Then he studied law, was admitted to the bar in 1796, and commenced practice in Delhi, New York.

Career
Erastus Root was a member of the New York State Assembly (Delaware Co.) in 1798–99, 1800–01, and 1802. Root was elected as a Democratic-Republican to the 8th United States Congress, holding office from March 4, 1803, to March 3, 1805. Afterwards he resumed his law practice. He was then elected to the 11th United States Congress, holding office from March 4, 1809, to March 3, 1811, and was Chairman of the Committee on Claims. Root was a member of the New York State Senate (Middle D.) from 1812 to 1815, sitting in the 35th, 36th, 37th, and 38th New York State Legislatures.

In 1815, Root contested successfully the election of John Adams to the 14th United States Congress arguing that ballots that were cast for "Erastus Rott" should be counted for him, and took his seat on December 26, 1815, served until March 3, 1817, and was Chairman of the Committee on Expenditures in the War Department.

He was again a member of the State Assembly (Delaware Co.) in 1818, 1819, 1820, and 1820–21; and was a delegate to the New York State Constitutional Convention of 1821. He was Lieutenant Governor of New York from 1823 to 1824, but was defeated when running for re-election on the ticket with Samuel Young in 1824. However, in March–April 1824, Erastus Root was honored with two votes at the Democratic-Republican Party Caucus to be the party's candidate for U.S. Vice President at the election later that year.

He was again a member of the State Assembly (Delaware Co.) in 1826, 1827, 1828, and 1830; and was Speaker in 1827, 1828, and 1830.

He was elected as a Jacksonian to the 22nd United States Congress, holding office from March 4, 1831, to March 3, 1833, and was Chairman of the Committee on Agriculture. In 1838, this time as a Whig, he ran again for the House but was defeated.

He was again a member of the State Senate (3rd D.) from 1840 to 1843, sitting in the 63rd, 64th, 65th, and 66th New York State Legislatures.

Root also served as Major-General of the New York State Militia.

Personal life
On October 4, 1806, Root was married to Elizabeth Stockton (1788–1871), a daughter of Charles W. Stockton and Elizabeth (née North) Stockton. Together, they were the parents of five children, three girls and two boys, including:

 Juliana Root (1807–1898), who married U.S. Representative Selah Reeve Hobbie (1797–1854) in 1826.
 Charles Root (1809–1828), who died aboard the USS Hudson in Rio de Janeiro in December 1828.
 Elizabeth Root (1813–1868), who married Henry Lee Robinson (1812–1901), a Brig. Gen. in the Union Army during the U.S. Civil War.
 William Root (b. 1814), who married Emily (née Wheelock) Dickinson (1816–1857), a daughter of Col. J. Wheelock.
 Augusta Root (1815–1838), who married William Fuller.

Root died in New York City on December 24, 1846.  He was originally buried at the Old Cemetery, but later re-interred at Woodland Cemetery, both in Delhi.

Legacy and honors
The Town of Root in Montgomery County, New York is named for him.

References

External links

 
 Root a The Political Graveyard

1773 births
1846 deaths
18th-century American politicians
19th-century American politicians
People from Hebron, Connecticut
Dartmouth College alumni
New York (state) state senators
Lieutenant Governors of New York (state)
Speakers of the New York State Assembly
New York (state) Whigs
Democratic-Republican Party members of the United States House of Representatives from New York (state)
Jacksonian members of the United States House of Representatives from New York (state)
Members of the United States House of Representatives from New York (state)